The 1993 U.S. Open Cup was the 80th edition of the soccer tournament to crown the national champion of the United States.

San Francisco's Club Deportivo Mexico (SFSFL) won the Open Cup by defeating Philadelphia's United German-Hungarians 5–0 in the final at Kuntz Stadium in Indianapolis, Indiana.

With coach Slavador Lopez and marksman Jose Angulo aboard, CD Mexico had outdueled defending Open Cup holders San Jose Oaks 1–0 in earlier regional stages, then swept through the regional final to a semifinal meeting with the Milwaukee Bavarians. In that semifinal, Angulo's goal kept the game 1-1. With the game in overtime and the San Francisco side down to nine men, Angulo broke through on his own twice to give his beleaguered side a memorable 3–1 win.

Bracket 

a) CD Mexico advance 4–1 on penaltiesb) McCormick Kickers advance 5–4 on penalties

Final

MVP: Elias Fonseca

External links
 1993 U.S. Open Cup results

References

U.S. Open Cup
Cup